"Not Today" is a song by American  singer Mary J. Blige, featuring guest vocals by rapper Eve. It was written by Blige, Eve, Dr. Dre, Mike Elizondo, Theron Feemster, and Bruce Miller for her sixth studio album Love & Life (2003), while production was helmed by Dr. Dre. It was released as the album's third single in 2003, also serving as a promotional single to the soundtrack of the motion picture Barbershop 2: Back in Business (2003).

Track listings

Charts

Certifications

References 

2003 singles
2004 singles
Eve (rapper) songs
Mary J. Blige songs
Music videos directed by Chris Robinson (director)
Songs written by Mary J. Blige
Song recordings produced by Dr. Dre
Songs written by Dr. Dre
Songs written by Theron Feemster
Songs written by Mike Elizondo
2003 songs
Geffen Records singles
Songs written by Eve (rapper)